Alberto Hernández may refer to:
Alberto Hernández (Negro leagues) (born 1917), Cuban professional baseball player
Alberto Hernández (catcher) (born 1969), Cuban baseball player
Alberto Hernández (footballer) (born 1977), Spanish footballer